Karadeh (also Romanized as Karādeh and Karrādeh) is a village in Pol Beh Bala Rural District, Simakan District, Jahrom County, Fars Province, Iran. At the 2006 census, its population was 762, in 172 families.

References 

Populated places in Jahrom County